Sakçagözü, also known as Keferdiz, is a village in the Nurdağı District, Gaziantep Province, Turkey. The village is populated by Alevi Turkmens and had a population of 3920 in 2022.

References

Villages in Nurdağı District